Ernest J. King High School is a United States Department of Defense school in Sasebo, Japan.  It was named after US Fleet Admiral Ernest King, who is notable for his actions in World War II.

References

Schools in Japan